Dicheirus is a genus of beetles in the family Carabidae, containing the following species:

 Dicheirus dilatatus Dejean, 1829
 Dicheirus obtusus LeConte, 1852
 Dicheirus piceus Menetries, 1845
 Dicheirus pilosus G. Horn, 1880
 Dicheirus strenuus G. Horn, 1868

References

Harpalinae